Wielichowo  (German Friedrichsthal) is a village in the administrative district of Gmina Słupsk, within Słupsk County, Pomeranian Voivodeship, in northern Poland.

Before 1945, Wielichowo was part of Germany and named Friedrichsthal; it was part of the village of Groß Brüskow.

The village has a population of 111.

References

Wielichowo